The Ministry of Justice of Alberta, commonly called Alberta Justice, is the Cabinet ministry responsible for providing legal advice and overseeing provincial law enforcement to the government of Alberta, Canada. The ministry was created in 2012 by merging the Ministry of Justice and Attorney General and Ministry of the Solicitor General and Public Security.  It was formerly called Alberta Justice and Solicitor General from 2012 to 2022.

The current Minister of Justice is Tyler Shandro since February 25, 2022.

List of Ministers

 Jonathan Denis 2012-2015
 Kathleen Ganley 2015-2019
 Doug Schweitzer 2019-2020
 Kaycee Madu 2020-2022
 Tyler Shandro 2022-present

For list of ministers for two separate preceding posts see:

 Attorneys General of Alberta
 Solicitors General of Alberta

See also 

 Justice ministry
 Politics of Alberta

References

Solicitors general
Attorneys general of Canadian provinces
Justice
Alberta